Sylvan Nathan Goldman (November 15, 1898 – November 25, 1984) was an American businessman and inventor of the shopping cart.  His design had a pair of large wire baskets connected by tubular metal arms with four wheels.

Early life
Born Sylvan Nathan Goldman to a Jewish family, the son of Hortense (née Dreyfus) and Michael Goldman, in Ardmore, Chickasaw Nation, Oklahoma. His mother had emigrated from France and his father from Latvia. He had one older brother, Alfred. His father worked at various dry goods stores owned by his wife's family, one of which was located in Indian territory where Sylvan was born. Sylvan was raised in the Jewish faith and was bar mitzvahed. Sylvan learned the retail trade from his father and his mother's uncles.

Goldman served in World War I as a food requisitionist in France. His brother served in the US Army but was discharged for health reasons. Goldman was not educated past the eighth grade.

Career
After the war, in 1919, Sylvan and his brother Alfred opened the Goldman Brothers Wholesale Fruits and Produce in Breckenridge, Texas. They were initially very successful due to the then oil boom in Texas, but their situation quickly deteriorated once the boom ended. The brothers then moved to California, where they worked for grocery wholesalers. Initially planning on opening their own wholesale food business in California, they instead returned to Oklahoma at the behest of their uncles who wanted to start their own retail food store chain. The uncles offered to put up all the money as well as to cede the brothers a 75% interest in the venture. Accepting the generous offer and armed with an understanding of a new store concept that they had seen in California, the "supermarket" – where all different types of food were available for sale in a single store and customers served themselves – they returned to Oklahoma and founded the state's first supermarket, the Sun Grocery Company. They opened their first store on April 3, 1920, at 1403 East Fifteenth Street in Tulsa, Oklahoma, with Sylvan serving as president and Alfred as vice president. Within one year, they were operating twenty-one Sun Grocery markets throughout the state. Within three years, they had fifty-five stores.

In 1929, they sold the Sun chain to Skaggs-Safeway Stores several months before the Stock Market Crash of 1929. Despite reaping a generous and timely sum from the Safeway sale, Goldman and his brother lost much of their fortune in the crash; and being banned from competing with Safeway in Tulsa due to a non-competition agreement, they moved to Oklahoma City where they purchased five grocery stores and formed a new company called Standard Grocery. They soon implemented the lessons they had learned in Tulsa and with their profits purchased the faltering Humpty-Dumpty grocery store chain in 1934. Alfred died in 1937.

In 1943, Sylvan merged the two brands into one company: Standard-Humpty Dumpty. Concerned with alleviating the difficulty women had with the self-serve concept as they often had to handle both the shopping basket and children, he developed what was to become the shopping cart.

Invention of shopping cart

He introduced the device on June 4, 1937, in the Humpty Dumpty supermarket chain in Oklahoma City, of which he was the owner. With the assistance of a mechanic named Fred Young, Goldman constructed the first shopping cart, basing his design on that of a wooden folding chair. They built it with a metal frame and added wheels and wire baskets. Another mechanic, Arthur Kosted, developed a method to mass-produce the carts by inventing an assembly line capable of forming and welding the wire. The cart was awarded patent number 2,196,914 on April 9, 1940 (Filing date: March 14, 1938), titled, "Folding Basket Carriage for Self-Service Stores". They advertised the invention as part of a new "No Basket Carrying Plan."

The invention did not catch on immediately. Men found them effeminate; women found them suggestive of a baby carriage. "I've pushed my last baby buggy," offended women informed him. After hiring several male and female models to push his new invention around his store and demonstrate their utility, as well as greeters to explain their use, his folding-style shopping carts became extremely popular and Goldman became a multimillionaire by collecting a royalty on every folding design shopping cart in the United States.

Sylvan Goldman also manufactured the more familiar and more modern "nesting cart" under a license granted by Telescope Carts, Inc.  In 1946, Orla Watson, co-founder of Telescope Carts, Inc. developed an innovative "nesting" shopping cart that did not require disassembly after each use as Goldman's designs did, and which allowed for the shopping carts to telescope, or "nest", by simply shoving the carts together.  Goldman patented his own "Nest-Kart" over a year later in 1948, so an interference investigation was ordered by Watson of Telescope Carts, Inc. for alleged patent infringement during the same time period.  In a compromise solution, Goldman agreed to relinquish his rights on his existing patent and agreed to pay the sum of $1 for counterfeit damages.  In return, Telescope Cart, Inc. agreed to an exclusive license granted to Goldman's company for the production of the telescoping, or "nesting", cart.  The telescoping cart, based on the patent issued to Watson, forms the basis of the shopping cart designs used to the present, and all royalties for the new design were paid to Telescope Carts, Inc. until their patent expired.

Other inventions
Other inventions by Goldman includes the grocery sacker, the folding inter-office basket carrier, and the handy milk bottle rack. Goldman also invented the baggage cart.

Philanthropy

Goldman and his wife were known for their philanthropy. As a patron of the arts he contributed many works of art to Oklahoma institutions. He gave time and money to the National Conference of Christians and Jews at the Southwest Center for Human Relations at the University of Oklahoma. He received many honors, including honorary chief of the Pawnee Indian Tribe (1950), the Eleanor Roosevelt Humanities Award (1965), a Distinguished Service Citation from the University of Oklahoma (1971), induction into the Oklahoma Hall of Fame (1971), and an honorary doctor of law degree from Oklahoma City University (1974). In 1981 he funded the construction of the portico and western entry of Temple B'nai Israel (Oklahoma City). In January 1983 the Oklahoma Blood Institute moved to the Sylvan N. Goldman Center, located at 1001 North Lincoln Boulevard and named for Goldman, who donated $1.5 million for the center.

Personal life
On June 7, 1931, Goldman married Margaret "Babe" Katz (1906-1984) of Stillwater, Oklahoma; they had two sons: Monte Henry Goldman and Alfred Dreyfus Goldman. Both his sons died under suspicious circumstances: Monte in 1995 and Alfred in 1997.

References

External links
 Entry in Oklahoma Historical Society's Encyclopedia of Oklahoma History & Culture
 Sylvan N. Goldman, 86, Dies; Inventor of the Shopping Cart | NY Times | November 27, 1984

1898 births
1984 deaths
Jewish American philanthropists
People from Ardmore, Oklahoma
Jews and Judaism in Oklahoma
20th-century American inventors
20th-century American philanthropists
20th-century American Jews
Inventors from Oklahoma